West Michigan and Western Michigan are terms for an arbitrary region in the U.S. state of Michigan's Lower Peninsula. Most narrowly it refers to the Grand Rapids-Muskegon-Holland area, and more broadly to most of the region along the Lower Peninsula's Lake Michigan shoreline, but there is no official definition.

Definition

In general, "West Michigan" often refers to the area bounded by the cities of Muskegon (in the north), Grand Rapids (in the northeast), Kalamazoo–Battle Creek (in the southeast) and St. Joseph–Benton Harbor (in the southwest).  However, definitions of the boundaries of the region vary widely; in some contexts, the term "West Michigan" is applied only to the counties of Allegan, Kent, Muskegon, and Ottawa, which together compose the Grand Rapids-Kentwood-Muskegon CSA.  Other definitions include the Kalamazoo–Battle Creek and Benton Harbor–St. Joseph regions, which can be considered distinct regions or parts of other regions such as Michiana, Southern Michigan, or Southwest Michigan, the latter in the case of Benton Harbor–St. Joseph.

The northern boundary of the region is also poorly defined; the population density, land use, economic and cultural character, and physical geography most often associated with West Michigan fades in northern Muskegon and Kent Counties, however areas as far north as Ludington and White Cloud may be included because of their close economic ties to the cities to the south.  Other areas, such as Montcalm County in the northeast corner of the region, are transitional areas that straddle Michigan regions but are sometimes included for classification purposes. Greenville, in Montcalm County's southwest corner, is closely tied economically with Grand Rapids; however, the northeastern corner, around Vestaburg and Edmore, has historically more closely associated with the cities of Mount Pleasant and Alma, which are almost universally reckoned as part of Central Michigan.

Geography
See also List of Michigan state parks and Geography of Michigan.
Counties in the area are part of the Roman Catholic Diocese of Grand Rapids or the Roman Catholic Diocese of Kalamazoo.
In northwest Kent County is Fruit Ridge, which is a prime fruit-growing region; that accounts for 65% of all Michigan apple production.

Municipalities

The following table contains the largest municipalities of West Michigan according to the 2010 Census.  This defines the region fairly broadly, but not at its most broadly; if Battle Creek were included, it would be ranked fourth.

Five of the above cities, Wyoming, Kentwood, Portage, Norton Shores, and Walker, are former suburban townships that incorporated in the 1960s in order to prevent annexation by an adjacent city.  The presence of these cities in the top ten reflects both the large geographic area of these cities, as well as the long and continuing growth of suburban areas in West Michigan.

Events
ArtPrize in Grand Rapids
National Baby Food Festival in Fremont
Big Rapids Riverdays in Big Rapids
Celebration on the Grand in Grand Rapids (now defunct)
Coast Guard Festival in Grand Haven
Festival of the Arts in Grand Rapids
Fruitport Old Fashioned Days in Fruitport
Spring Lake Heritage Festival in Spring Lake
Kalamazoo Irish Fest in Kalamazoo
Michigan Irish Music Festival in Muskegon
Muskegon Bike Time in Muskegon
Muskegon Air Show (now defunct)
Muskegon Film Festival
Muskegon Summer Celebration (now defunct)
Rebel Road in Muskegon
Red Flannel Festival in Cedar Springs
Rothbury Music Festival in Rothbury
Tulip Time Festival in Holland
Unity Christian Music Festival in Muskegon
Venetian Festival in St. Joseph
Waterfront Film Festival in Saugatuck

Attractions

Croton Dam
Dutch Village
Frederik Meijer Gardens & Sculpture Park
Gerald R. Ford Presidential Museum
Grand Haven Musical Fountain
Grand Haven State Park
Grand Rapids Art Museum
Grand Rapids Children's Museum
Hardy Dam
Holland State Park
John Ball Zoo in Grand Rapids
Kalamazoo Air Zoo
Kruizenga Art Museum
Manistee National Forest
Michigan's Adventure amusement park
Newaygo State Park
P.J. Hoffmaster State Park
Public Museum of Grand Rapids
Timber Ridge Ski Area
Binder Park Zoo

Universities and colleges

Andrews University
Aquinas College
Baker College
Calvin University
Cornerstone University
Davenport University
Ferris State University
Grand Rapids Community College
Grand Valley State University
Hope College
Kalamazoo College
Kendall College of Art and Design
Kuyper College
Muskegon Community College
Western Michigan University

Business
Prominent West Michigan corporations include:

Amway/Alticor/Quixtar, an Ada multi-level marketing company
Bissell, a Walker vacuum cleaner maker
Borroughs, a Kalamazoo office equipment manufacturer
Foremost Insurance, a Farmers Insurance Group company
Gentex, a Zeeland auto-dimming automobile mirror manufacturer
Gerber Products Company, a Fremont baby food manufacturer
Gordon Food Service, a Wyoming food supplier
Herman Miller, a Zeeland office equipment manufacturer
Haworth, a Holland office equipment manufacturer
Howard Miller a Zeeland manufacturer of longcase clocks
Kellogg's, a Battle Creek breakfast cereal producer
Meijer, a Walker hypermarket chain
Old Orchard Brands, a Sparta juice producer
Perrigo, an Allegan pharmaceutical company
Spartan Stores, a Byron Township grocery chain
Steelcase, a Grand Rapids office equipment manufacturer
Stryker, a Kalamazoo surgical equipment manufacturer
Whirlpool, a Benton Harbor manufacturer of major home appliances
Wolverine World Wide/Hush Puppies, a Rockford shoe maker
X-Rite, a Grand Rapids manufacturer of color matching products

Mary Free Bed Rehabilitation Hospital, in Grand Rapids

Transportation

Major airports
Gerald R. Ford International Airport
Kalamazoo/Battle Creek International Airport
Muskegon County Airport

Railways
Coopersville and Marne Railway
CSX
Grand Trunk Western Railway, subsidiary of Canadian National Railway.
Grand Elk Railroad
Grand Rapids Eastern Railroad
Michigan Shore Railroad
Michigan Southern Railroad
Norfolk Southern Railway
West Michigan Railroad

Amtrak operates its Pere Marquette service in West Michigan, with daily service between Grand Rapids and Chicago.

Major roads

Interstate highways
, running from Muskegon to Detroit
, splitting from I-96 in Grand Rapids and going west-southwest and merging with US 31 near Holland before intersecting I-94 near Benton Harbor
, running from Billings, Montana, to Port Huron, Michigan

US highways
 Michigan Avenue and Chicago Road
, running from Mackinaw City, Michigan, to Mobile, Alabama
, running from north of Middlebury, Indiana, to Petoskey, Michigan
Grand River Avenue, running from Grand Rapids to Detroit
 The S-Curve, a famously crooked stretch of US 131 in downtown Grand Rapids

Michigan highways
, also known as the South Beltline, bypasses Grand Rapids connecting to I-96 east of town and I-196 west of town
, running from the southwest corner of Battle Creek at exit 92 on I-94 to the Mission Point Light on Old Mission Point in Grand Traverse County.
, a highway in southwestern and central Michigan from South Haven to Webberville
 (Lake Michigan Drive), running east–west from Grand Rapids through Allendale and ending at Lake Michigan.
, a cross-peninsular road, running across the entire mitten of the Lower Peninsula including the Thumb, from Port Sanilac on the Lake Huron shore, through Saginaw near Saginaw Bay, and on to Muskegon on the Lake Michigan shore.
 running North and South from Mottville, Michigan, to Holland, Michigan.

Other
Eastern port of the Lake Express High Speed Car Ferry; Muskegon
The SS Badger in Ludington
The West Michigan Tourist Association promotes the region from a tourism standpoint

Notable residents or former residents

More comprehensive lists are available at individual cities, villages, etc.

Justin Abdelkader, Detroit Red Wings forward
Gillian Anderson, actress
Jim Bakker, television evangelist 
Johnny Benson, stock car driver
Dan Bylsma, NHL hockey coach 
Roger B. Chaffee, NASA astronaut
Kirk Cousins, quarterback for the Minnesota Vikings
Terry Crews, actor
Betsy DeVos, U.S. Secretary of Education
Debarge, music group
Thomas White Ferry, U.S. Senator 
Nancy Anne Fleming, Miss America 1961
Gerald R. Ford, President of the United States
James Frey, writer
Frank Daniel Gerber, founder of the Gerber Products Company
Al Green, R&B/Gospel artist
Mark Grimmette, Olympics luger
Ernie Hudson, actor
Iggy Pop, punk rock icon
Tom Izzo, Michigan State Spartans Basketball coach
Derek Jeter, New York Yankees shortstop
Greg Jennings, Green Bay Packers wide receiver
Maynard James Keenan, Tool and A Perfect Circle vocalist
W.K. Kellogg, Kellogg Company founder
Anthony Kiedis, Red Hot Chili Peppers vocalist
Stanley Ketchel, Middleweight Champion boxer
Taylor Lautner, actor
Buster Mathis, heavyweight boxer
Floyd Mayweather, professional boxer
Nate McLouth, professional baseball player
Harry Morgan, actor
Jason Newsted, musician, Metallica
Mustard Plug, ska band
Pop Evil, hard rock band
Andy Richter, television entertainer
Del Shannon, musician
Sinbad, actor and comedian
Wayne Static, Static-X lead singer/guitarist
Bill Szymczyk, music producer for the Eagles, The Who, and others
Sojourner Truth, abolitionist
Vonda Kay Van Dyke, Miss America 1965
Brian Vander Ark, Verve Pipe frontman
Dick York, actor

Notes

See also
List of counties in Michigan
Michiana
Southern Michigan
Michigan

External links 
 West Michigan Tourist Association
 Clarke Historical Library, Central Michigan University, Bibliography on Michigan (arranged by counties and regions)
 Michigan Geology -- Clarke Historical Library, Central Michigan University.
 Great Lakes Coast Watch
 Info Michigan, detailed information on 630 cities
 Michigan Department of Natural Resources website, harbors, hunting, resources and more.
 List of Museums, other attractions compiled by state government.
 Michigan Historic Markers
 Michigan's Official Economic Development and Travel Site.
 
 Map of Michigan Lighthouse in PDF Format.
 Seeing the Light, Terry Pepper on lighthouses of the Western Great Lakes.

 
Regions of Michigan